José Torres Laboy (born September 8, 1971, in Salinas) is a Puerto Rican sport shooter. He won a silver medal in the men's double trap at the 2011 Pan American Games in Guadalajara, Mexico, accumulating a score of 185 targets (136 in the qualifying round and 49 in the final).

At age 40, Torres held his distinction of being the oldest member of the Puerto Rican team to be selected for the 2012 Summer Olympics in London, where he competed in the men's double trap. He scored a total of 127 targets in the qualifying rounds by one point ahead of U.S. shooter and defending Olympic champion Walton Eller, finishing only in twenty-first place.

References

External links
NBC Olympics Profile

1971 births
Living people
Puerto Rican male sport shooters
Trap and double trap shooters
Olympic shooters of Puerto Rico
Shooters at the 2012 Summer Olympics
Shooters at the 2011 Pan American Games
Pan American Games silver medalists for Puerto Rico
People from Salinas, Puerto Rico
Shooters at the 2015 Pan American Games
Pan American Games medalists in shooting
Medalists at the 2011 Pan American Games